The Daughter of the Green Pirate (Italian: La figlia del corsaro verde) is a 1940 Italian adventure film directed by Enrico Guazzoni and starring Doris Duranti, Fosco Giachetti and Camillo Pilotto. It was shot partly at the Pisorno Studios in Tirrenia with sets designed by the art director Piero Filippone. The film was based on a novel by Emilio Salgari.

Synopsis
The son of a Spanish Governor in South America volunteers for an undercover mission to infiltrate a gang of notorious pirates.

Cast
 Doris Duranti as Manuela 
 Fosco Giachetti as Carlos de la Riva 
 Camillo Pilotto as Zampa di ferro 
 Mariella Lotti as Isabella 
 Enrico Glori as El Rojo 
 Sandro Ruffini as Don Luis, il governatore 
 Tina Lattanzi as Donna Mercedes, moglie del governatore 
 Polidor as Golia 
 Carmen Navasqués as Carmen, la danzatrice 
 Ernesto Almirante as Il precettore delle educante 
 Primo Carnera as El Cabezo 
 Mario Siletti as Il segretario del governatore 
 Nino Marchetti as Ramon 
 Giulio Battiferri as Un pirata 
 Ori Monteverdi as Grazia 
 Dedi Montano as Estella 
 Nada Fiorelli as Leonora 
 Nino Marchesini as Il capitano dell'Esperanza 
 Luigi Erminio D'Olivo as Il messo del governatore 
 Enzo De Felice as Gonzalo 
 Riccardo De Miceli as L'ufficiale scozzese 
 Gino Scotti as José 
 Maria Maloggi as Un'educante 
 Nennella Scotti as Un'altra educante 
 Leo Garavaglia as Un pirata 
 Emilio Gneme as Un pirata 
 Enrico Marroni as Un pirata

References

Bibliography 
 Gundle, Stephen. Mussolini's Dream Factory: Film Stardom in Fascist Italy. Berghahn Books, 2013.

External links 
 

1940 films
Italian historical adventure films
1940s historical adventure films
1940s Italian-language films
Films directed by Enrico Guazzoni
Films based on The Corsairs of the Antilles
Italian black-and-white films
Films shot at Tirrenia Studios
Films set in the 17th century
1940s Italian films